Strawberry Hill is a hill in San Francisco, California, near the center of  Golden Gate Park. The hill occupies an entire island in the park's man-made Stow Lake, and is connected by two bridges to the mainland of the park.

The island is covered with a variety of trees and shrubbery and contains several trails and dirt steps that encircle and lead to the top of the hill.

Huntington Falls
Strawberry hill contains Huntington Falls, the 110 foot tall, first artificial waterfall installed in Golden Gate Park that leads into the lake. The waterfall was named after railroad baron Collis Potter Huntington, who donated $25,000 to the cause.

Golden Gate Pavilion
The Golden Gate Pavilion, is a Chinese peace pagoda stands near the shore of the lake presented to San Francisco by its sister city Taipei in 1976.

Sweeney Observatory
The top of the hill is a quiet and peaceful open space with panoramic views of San Francisco although the view is slightly obscured by trees. In the center of the open area are the ruined foundations of the Sweeny Observatory, built in 1891 as a public viewpoint and destroyed by the 1906 earthquake.

Paths are closed to vehicle traffic. The hill is a popular destination for joggers and dog-walkers, especially on the weekends.  Local high school track and cross country teams are frequently seen practicing running up and around the hill for resistance training.

References

Landmarks in San Francisco
Golden Gate Park
Hills of San Francisco